is a Japanese public university located in Takizawa, Iwate, founded in 1998.

History
Iwate Prefectural University was established in 1998, with a graduate school following in 1999. In 2000, a teacher's training school was added, followed by a graduate school of nursing (master's and PhD program) in 2001.

Organization

Undergraduate
School of Nursing
School of Social Welfare
Faculty of Software and Information Science
Faculty of Policy Management

Graduate
Nursing Graduate School ( Master's Program, Doctoral Program )
Social Welfare Studies (Master's Program, Doctoral Program)
Software and Information Science (Master's Program, Doctoral Program)
Graduate School of Policy (Master's Program, Doctoral Program)

Junior Colleges
Morioka Junior College
Miyako Junior College

References

External links
 Official website

Educational institutions established in 1998
Public universities in Japan
Universities and colleges in Iwate Prefecture
1998 establishments in Japan
Takizawa, Iwate